Vadim Nikolayevitch Sadovsky (1934–2012) was a Russian professor and Chief of the Department for Philosophical and Sociological Problems of Systems Research, Institute for Systems Analysis, part of the Russian Academy of Sciences. He is known as a promoter of systems theory in Russia.

Selected publications 
 Blauberg, Igor, Viktorovich, V. N. Sadovsky, and E. G. Yudin. Systems theory: Philosophical and methodological problems. Moscow: Progress Publishers, 1977.
 Vadim N. Sadovsky and Stuart A. Umpleby (ed.). A Science of goal formulation : American and Soviet discussions of cybernetics and systems theory. New York, Hemisphere Pub. Corp., 1991.
 Bogdanov, Aleksandr, and Vadim N. Sadovsky. Bogdanov's Tektology. University of Hull, Centre for Systems Studies, 1996.

Articles, a selection
 Sadovsky, V. N. "Foundations of general systems theory." М.: Sov. Radio (1974).
 Blauberg, I. V., V. N. Sadovskii, and B. G. Iudin. "Philosophical Principles of Systemicity and the Systems Approach." Soviet Studies in Philosophy 17.4 (1979): 44–68.

References

1934 births
2012 deaths
Full Members of the Russian Academy of Sciences
Systems scientists